25 (twenty-five) is the natural number following 24 and preceding 26.

In mathematics

It is a square number, being 52 = 5 × 5. It is one of two two-digit numbers whose square and higher powers of the number also ends in the same last two digits, e.g., 252 = 625; the other is 76. It is the smallest square that is also a sum of two (non-zero) squares: 25 = 32 + 42. Hence, it often appears in illustrations of the Pythagorean theorem.

25 is the sum of the five consecutive single-digit odd natural numbers 1, 3, 5, 7, and 9.

25 is a centered octagonal number, a centered square number, a centered octahedral number, and an automorphic number.

It is the smallest decimal Friedman number as it can be expressed by its own digits: 52.

It is also a Cullen number and a vertically symmetrical number. 25 is the smallest pseudoprime satisfying the congruence 7n = 7 mod n.

25 is the smallest aspiring number — a composite non-sociable number whose aliquot sequence does not terminate.

According to the Shapiro inequality, 25 is the smallest odd integer n such that there exist x, x, ..., x such that

where x = x, x = x.

Within decimal, one can readily test for divisibility by 25 by seeing if the last two digits of the number match 00, 25, 50, or 75.

There are 25 primes under 100.

In science
 The Standard Model of physics features a total of 25 elementary particles: 12 fermions (made of 6 quarks and 6 leptons) and 13 bosons (made of 12 gauge bosons and 1 scalar boson).
The atomic number of manganese.
The average percentage DNA overlap of an individual with their half-sibling, grandparent, grandchild, aunt, uncle, niece, nephew, identical twin cousin (offspring of identical twins), or double cousin.

In religion
In Ezekiel's vision of a new temple:  The number twenty-five is of cardinal importance in Ezekiel's Temple Vision (in the Bible, Ezekiel chapters 40–48).
In Islam, there are 25 prophets mentioned in the Quran.

In sports
 Before 2020, the size of the full roster on a Major League Baseball team for most of the season, except for regular-season games on or after September 1, when teams expanded their roster to 40 players.
 The size of the playing roster on a Nippon Professional Baseball team for a particular game. Active NPB rosters consist of 28 players, but prior to each game, managers must designate three players who will be ineligible for that game.
In baseball, the number 25 is typically reserved for the best slugger on the team. Examples include Mark McGwire, Barry Bonds, Jim Thome, and Mark Teixeira.
The number of points needed to win a set in volleyball under rally scoring rules (except for the fifth set), so long as the losing team's score is two less than the winning team's score (i.e., if the winning team scores 25 points, the losing team can have no more than 23 points)
In U.S. college football, schools that are members of NCAA Division I FBS are allowed to provide athletic scholarships to a maximum of 25 new football players (i.e., players who were not previously receiving scholarships) each season.

In other fields
Twenty-five is:
Part of the name of the LSD-25 molecule.
The number of years of marriage marked in a silver wedding anniversary.
The minimum age of candidates for election to the United States House of Representatives. "Under 25" provides a common cut-off point for designating youth.
The number of cents in a quarter.
The usual TCP port for SMTP.
The name of the national board game of India (Pachisi — Hindi for 25).
The name of an Irish card game, see Spoil Five.
The per-second frame rate of the PAL video standard.
The name of Adele's 2015 album 25, named for her age in that year.
The number of the French department Doubs.
The temperature, in Celsius, at which some characteristics of semiconductors are specifically given in a datasheet.
The number of panels on the weekly TV Asahi quiz show Panel Quiz Attack 25.

Slang names
 Pony (British slang for £25)

See also
 List of highways numbered 25

References

Integers